Michela Greco (born 27 July 1983) is an Italian former football midfielder who played in the Serie A for clubs including ASDF Riviera di Romagna, ASD Fiammamonza, ASDC Chiasiellis and ACF Milan. She has been a member of the Italy national team, scoring one goal in the 2007 World Cup qualifying against Greece.

References

1983 births
Living people
Italian women's footballers
Italy women's international footballers
Sportspeople from Varese
Women's association football midfielders
A.S.D. Calcio Chiasiellis players
ASD Fiammamonza 1970 players
Footballers from Lombardy
ASD Femminile Inter Milano players
ACF Milan players
Inter Milan (women) players
FF Lugano 1976 players
Expatriate women's footballers in Switzerland
Italian expatriate sportspeople in Switzerland
A.S.D. AGSM Verona F.C. players